Just for Men is an American-based multi-national men's care brand focusing on hair color (Control GX, Original Formula, AutoStop, Mustache & Beard, Touch of Gray, and Touch of Gray Mustache & Beard), beard care (The Best Face and Beard Wash, The Best Beard Conditioner, and The Best Beard Oil), and hair re-growth designed for and marketed to men and manufactured by Combe Incorporated. Just for Men hair color brands are designed to color gray hair, with the Control Gx and Touch of Gray product lines providing options for gradual hair coloring. Just For Men comes in over 12 shades ranging from Sandy Blond to Jet Black.  

Ingredients include ethoxydiglycol (an organic solvent), oleyl alcohol, vegetable fatty acid, ethanolamine (solvent and alkalizer), erythorbic acid (antioxidant and sunscreen), trisodium EDTA (protects the other ingredients against water-born copper), polyquaterium-22 (polymer conditioner), p-aminophenol and p-phenylenediamine (reactive coloring agents), resorcinol, and hydrogen peroxide.

The product is available in Argentina, Australia, Brazil, Canada, Chile, India, Ireland, Italy, Israel, Mexico, Netherlands, New Zealand, Singapore, Spain, Thailand, Turkey the United Kingdom, and the United States.

Advertising
Just for Men television advertising in the United States features sports celebrities Walt Frazier and Keith Hernandez as sportscasters, whose ads have aired for over five and a half years. A January 2008 spot had them visiting a grey-bearded Emmitt Smith in an NFL style nursing home where Frazier proclaims "Your 'stache is trash!" and "The beard is weird!"

Additionally, Just for Men often sponsors sports events, specific examples including the PGA Tour's "Right on Target Shot" segment and WWE's "Rewind" and "Slam of the Week".

Allergies
One of the active ingredients is PPD, p-phenylenediamine, which can cause a reaction in some people. Studies have shown that less than 5% of the population may experience some allergy, which can range from minor irritation, rashes and swelling to burning, though severe reactions are rare.  Manufacturer directions instruct users to do a 48-hour skin allergy test prior to use to detect and avoid any reactions. PPD was voted Allergen of the Year in 2006 by the American Contact Dermatitis Society.

Serious reactions
Meta analysis of several individual studies has suggested a linkage between some permanent hair dye products for men and an increased risk for leukemia.

See also

Grecian Formula

References

External links
Just for Men -- Official Site

Combe Incorporated brands
Hair care products
Hair coloring